Épiais-lès-Louvres (literally Épiais near Louvres) is a commune in the Val-d'Oise department in Île-de-France in northern France.

Education
 some preschool and elementary-aged students attend school in Roissy-en-France while others attend school in Louvres.

See also
Communes of the Val-d'Oise department

References

External links

Home page 

Association of Mayors of the Val d'Oise 

Communes of Val-d'Oise